Defraggler is a freemium defragmentation utility developed by Piriform Software, which can defragment individual files or groups of files on computer system. Defraggler runs on Microsoft Windows; it has support for all versions since Windows XP. It includes support for both IA-32 and x64 versions of these operating systems.

Overview 
Defraggler can defragment individual files, groups of files (in a folder) or an entire disk partition, either by the user's command or automatically on a schedule. It supports FAT32, NTFS, and exFAT. It can also be installed as a portable application on a USB flash drive. Defragmentation of RAID disks is also supported, although no details are supplied.

Defraggler was given a 5/5 star rating from Softpedia. In Lifehacker's Hive Five for Best Disk Defragmenter, Defraggler received first place.

See also 
CCleaner
Recuva
Comparison of defragmentation software

References

External links 
 

Utilities for Windows
Windows-only freeware
Defragmentation software
2008 software
Piriform Software
Gen Digital software